Guido Pella was the defending champion, but lost to eventual champion Guilherme Clezar in the quarterfinals.
Clezar defeated Facundo Bagnis 6–4, 6–4.

Seeds

Draw

Finals

Top half

Bottom half

References
 Main Draw
 Qualifying Draw

Tetra Pak Tennis Cup - Singles
2013 Singles